Ali Zangi (also Romanized as ‘Alī Zangī; also known as ‘Alī Rangī) is a village in Nimbeluk Rural District, Nimbeluk District, Qaen County, South Khorasan Province, Iran. At the 2006 census, its population was 101, in 29 families.

References 

Populated places in Qaen County